Kozhikode Narayanan Nair is an Indian actor who appears in Malayalam cinema. He has acted in more than 300 films. He was a stage actor before entering Malayalam film industry. His first film was Aabhijathyam (1970), and he is also remembered for his role as Valyamama in Valsalyam (1993).

Early life
Nair was born in 1940 in Panthirankavu in the Kozhikode district. He entered his career in early school days through drama playing activities. Later, he became the member of a professional drama troop - Stage India. He continued his drama life with employment in sylon printers. He later became the manager of Marikkar eng. company and Hindustan eng. company.

Film career
In his 50 years of the acting career, he completed 300 films in Malayalam industry. His first film was Aabhijathyam (1970). He then acted in movies such as Utharayanam, Nirmalyam, Kochuthemmadi, Oliyambukal, Bharatham, Aavanazhi, Sadhayam, ente sreekuttikku, Perumthachan and Mithunam. He appeared in a noteworthy role in Valsalyam (1993) as Valyamama, next to Mammootty. After Valsalyam (1993), he became an active artist in the Malayalam industry.

Personal life
A strong believer of Sathya Sai Baba, Nair usually visits Puttaparthi. He resides in Saiharitham, Kozhikode. His wife's name is Saradha. They have two children - one son (Suhas) and one daughter (Suchithra).

Partial filmography

 1921: Puzha Muthal Puzha Vare (2023) as Chekutty Sahib
 Thirayozhiyathe (2022)
 Marakkar: Lion of the Arabian Sea (2021)
 Kaalchilambu (2021)
 Drishyam 2 (2021) as Sulaiman
 Madhura Raja (2019)
 Villain (2017)
 Oppam (2016)
 Pallikoodam (2016)
 Ennu Ninte Moideen (2015)
 Central Theater (2014)
 Ottamandaaram (2014)
 To Noora with Love (2014)
 You Can Do (2013)
 Drishyam (2013) as Sulaiman
 Memories as Krishna Pillai
 72 Model (2013) as
 Vallatha Pahayan (2013)
 Nadodimannan (2013)
 Mizhi (2013)
 Papilio Buddha (2013)
 Kaanaapaadam (2013)
 Gramam (2012) as Panikkar 
 Mullamottum Munthiricharum (2012)
 Arike (2012)
 Da Thadiya (2012)
 Red Alert (2012)
 Shankaranum Mohananum (2011)
 PSC Balan (2011)
 Gramam (2011)
 August 15 (2011)
 Innanu Aa Kalyanam (2011)
 Annarakkannanum Thannalayahtu (2010)
 Karayilekku Oru Kadal Dooram (2010)
 Kaaryasthan (2010)
 Khilafath (2010)
 Avan (2010)
 Ring Tone (2010)
 Kanmazha Peyyum Munpe (2009)
 My Big Father (2009)
 Parayan Maranathu (2009)
 Cheriya Kallanum Valiya Policum (2009)
 Swarnam (2008)
 Madambi (2008)
 Parthan Kanda Paralokam (2008) as Poovanthottathu Chandran
 Vilapangalkkappuram (2008)
 Crazy Gopalan (2008) as Judge
 Jeevanam (2008)
 Mohitham (2008)
 Magic Lamp' (2008)
 Sooryan (2007)
 Arabikkatha (2007) as Ravunni Mash
 Kaiyoppu (2007) as Kammaran 
 Pathaka (2006)
 Vargam (2006)
 Thuruppugulan (2006)
 Lion (2006)
 The Tiger (2005)
 Lokanathan IAS (2005)
 Bharathchandran I.P.S. (2005)
 Mampazhakkalam (2004) as Thirumulpaddu
 Pravaasam (2004)
 Sahodaran Sahadevan (2003)
 Mr. Brahmachari (2003)
 Kilichundan Mampazham (2003) as Musaliar
 Meesa Madhavan (2002)
 Mazhathullikkilukkam (2002) as Father Ignatius
 Nandanam (2002)
 Chithrathoonukal (2001)
 Nariman (2001) as Judge
 Uthaman (2001)
 Bharthaavudyogam (2001)
 Saivar Thirumeni (2001) as Padmanabhan Nair
 Ival Draupadi (2000)
 Narasimham (2000)
 Aanamuttathe Angalamar (2000) as Balaraman Nair
 Naranathu Thampuran (2000) as Kunjiraman Nair
 Vinayapoorvam Vidhyaadharan (2000) as Appukuttan Nair
 Sradha (2000)
 Valliettan (2000) as Arakkal Kuttikrishnan Nair
 Rapid Action Force (2000) as Shenoy
 F.I.R (1999) as Tahir Sahib
 Pattabhishekam (1999)
 Ezhupunna Tharakan (1999) as  Paliyekkara Thampuran
 Stalin Sivadas (1999) as Luckose
 Pallavur Devanarayanan (1999) as Sankara Pothuval
 Daya (1998)
 Chenapparambile Aanakkariyam (1998)
 Ayushmanbhava (1998)
 Kannur (1997)
 Kalyaanakkacheri (1997)
 Anubhoothi (1997)
 Mangalya Pallakku (1997) as Sukumaran Nair
 Kilukil Pamparam (1997)
 Siamese Irattakal (1997)
 Suvarna Simhaasanam (1997)
 Five Star Hospital (1997)
 Asuravamsam (1997)
 Thoovalkottaram (1996)
 Mahathma (1996)
 Devaraagam(1996)
 Sulthan Hyderali (1996) as Menon
 Man of the Match (1996)
 Swapnalokathe Bhalabhaskaran (1996)
  Kaalapani (1996) as Nanu Nair
 Hitler (1996)
 Aksharam (1995)
 Sindoora Rekha (1995)
 Saadaram (1995)
 Sopanam (1994)
 Vaardhakyapuraanam (1994)
 Moonnaam Loka Pattaalam (1994) as Rajasekharan
 Sainyam (1994) as Swaminathan
 Pakshe (1994)
 Bhoomi Geetham (1993) as Marar
 Vatsalyam (1993) as Govindan Nair
 Samagamam (1993)
 Padheyam (1993) as Mangalasseri Govinda Menon
 Maya Mayuram (1993) as Mestri Madhavan
 Sthalathe Pradhana Payyans (1993) as Hakkim Bhai
 Adhwaytham (1992)
 Kaazhchakkappuram (1992)
 Ulsavapittennu (1988)

Television
He acted in 125 serials and 30 mega serial in Malayalam mini screen.

Noted works:

 Minnukettu Surya TV
 Parvanendu

References

External links
 May 2019 issue star talk ശുണ്ഠിക്കാരനല്ല വല്യ മാമ https://reader.magzter.com/preview/p83frh3v75alp4oyhofo3456130/345613#page/1 
 
 http://www.malayalamcinema.com/star-details.php?member_id=155
 http://entertainment.oneindia.in/celebs/narayanan-nair/filmography.html
 https://nettv4u.com/celebrity/malayalam/movie-actor/kozhikode-narayanan-nair

External links
 
 Kozhikode Narayanan Nair at MSI

Male actors from Kozhikode
Male actors in Malayalam cinema
Indian male film actors
20th-century Indian male actors
21st-century Indian male actors
Living people
1940 births
Followers of Sathya Sai Baba